Colchagua Province is one of three provinces of the central Chilean region of O'Higgins (VI). Its capital is San Fernando. It is bordered on the north by Cachapoal Province, on the east by the Argentine Republic, on the south by Curicó Province, and on the west by Cardenal Caro Province.

Geography and demography
Extending across the central valley of Chile, the province has a considerable area devoted to traditional agriculture and wine-growing. Its principal rivers are the Rapel River and its tributary, the Tinguiririca.
 
The principal towns are San Fernando, the provincial capital, Santa Cruz, Chimbarongo, Nancagua and Palmilla. San Fernando is one of the several towns founded in 1742 by the governor-general José Antonio Manso de Velasco, and it had a population of 64,000 in 2002.

Administration
As a province, Colchagua is a second-level administrative division of Chile, governed by a provincial delegate  who is appointed by the president.

The province comprises ten communes, each governed by a municipality consisting of an alcalde and municipal council.

 Chépica
 Chimbarongo
 Lolol
 Nancagua
 Palmilla
 Peralillo
 Placilla
 Pumanque
 San Fernando
 Santa Cruz

Transport
The state central railway (EFE) from Santiago to the south crosses the province and has a regular stop in San Fernando. It used to have a branch running from San Fernando via Palmilla to Pichilemu on the coast. This is now closed, although one section of it has recently opened a limited service aimed at the tourist trade.
 
The more local Metrotrén service runs between Santiago and San Fernando stopping at most of the towns in between. There are frequent trains between these two points.
 
The Pan-American Highway runs through the San Fernando commune, passing close to the east side of the town.

See also
 Tinguiririca River
 Maipo Valley
 Colchagua Valley (wine region)

References 

 

Provinces of Chile
Provinces of O'Higgins Region